Melandra (also spelled Μελάντρα) is an abandoned Turkish Cypriot village in the Paphos District of Cyprus, located  southeast of Lysos. Prior to 1974, the village was inhabited by Turkish Cypriots. The village is destroyed, apparently by shelling.

References

Communities in Paphos District
Turkish Cypriot villages depopulated after the 1974 Turkish invasion of Cyprus